Limosella aquatica is a widespread species of flowering plant in the figwort family known by the common name water mudwort. It is native to much of the temperate world, where it grows in many types of wet habitat. It is semiaquatic, growing in moist land habitat such as meadows, in mud and wet sand next to water, and partly submersed or floating in the water. It is a fleshy annual herb forming low tufts in muddy substrate.

References

External links
Jepson Manual Treatment
Photo gallery

Scrophulariaceae
Plants described in 1753
Taxa named by Carl Linnaeus